The Panhellenic Socialist Movement, known mostly by its acronym PASOK, is a social-democratic political party in Greece. Until 2012, it was one of the two major parties in the country, along with New Democracy, its main political rival.

Following the collapse of the Greek military dictatorship of 1967–1974, PASOK was founded on 3 September 1974 as a socialist, democratic socialist and left-wing nationalist party. 

Formerly the largest left-wing party in Greece between 1977 and 2012, PASOK lost much of its popular support as a result of the Greek debt crisis. When the crisis begun, PASOK was the ruling party and negotiated the first Greek bailout package with the European troika which necessitated harsh austerity measures. It caused a significant loss in popularity as a result of the economic crisis, the party was part of two coalition governments from 2011 to 2015, during which further austerity measures were taken in response to the crisis. Due to said measures and the crisis, PASOK went from being the largest party in the Hellenic Parliament with 160 seats (43.92% of the popular vote) in the 2009 election to being the smallest party with 13 seats (4.68% of the popular vote) in the January 2015 election. This decline became known as Pasokification.

To halt the party's decline, Fofi Gennimata was elected as the new president of the party and formed a political alliance known as the Democratic Alignment (DISI). In the September 2015 election, DISI was the fourth most voted-for party. In 2018, PASOK merged into a new political alliance of centre-left parties, again led by Gennimata, called the Movement for Change (KINAL), becoming the third largest party in the parliament in the 2019 election.

History

Foundation 
The first members of the party were the main organizers of the collapse of the military junta of 1967–1974 and the re-establishment of democracy on 3 September 1974. Its founder was Andreas Papandreou, son of the late Greek liberal leader and three-time Prime Minister of Greece Georgios Papandreou Sr, and its co-founder was trade unionist Georgios Daskalakis. Its founding mottos were "National Independence, Popular Sovereignty, Social Emancipation, Democratic Process." Andreas Papandreou was offered the leadership of the liberal political forces immediately after the restoration of democracy, but in a risky move he declined, so the leadership was assumed by Georgios Mavros. Papandreou, a powerful orator and charismatic leader, explicitly rejected the Venizelist ideological heritage of his father, and stressed the fact that he was a socialist, not a liberal.

Early years 
At the November 1974 elections the Party received only 13.5% of the vote and won 15 seats (out of 300), coming third behind the centre-right New Democracy of Konstantinos Karamanlis and the Centre Union – New Forces (EK-ND) of Giorgos Mavros. At the November 1977 elections, however, PASOK eclipsed the EK-ND, doubled its share of the vote and won 93 seats, becoming the main opposition party.

In government 
At the October 1981 national elections the PASOK won a landslide victory with 48.1% of the vote and capturing 172 seats; it formed the first socialist government in the history of Greece since 1924. Although Papandreou had campaigned for withdrawal of Greece from NATO and the European Economic Community, after a strong request by the rest of the party members and its supporters, changed his policy towards both institutions. He proved to be an excellent negotiator when it came to securing benefits and subsidies for Greece from the EEC. For example, in 1985 he openly threatened Jacques Delors to veto the entry of Spain and Portugal in the Community in order to secure more monetary aid for Greece.

In 1986, the PASOK government amended the Greek constitution to remove most powers from the President and give wider authority to the Prime Minister and the Executive Government. Civil marriages, not consecrated by religious ceremony, were recognized as equally valid with religious weddings. The left-wing Resistance movement against the Axis in World War II was finally formally recognized, and former leftist resistance fighters were given state pensions, while leftist political refugees of the Greek Civil War were finally given permission to return to Greece. The National Health System was created and various repressive laws of the anti-communist postwar establishment were abolished, wages were boosted, an independent and multidimensional foreign policy was pursued, many reforms in family law to strengthen the rights of women were undertaken and the Greek Gendarmerie was abolished in 1984. At the June 1985 elections, received 46% of the vote and won 161 seats, thus securing a stable parliamentary majority for its second term in power.

It continued to be popular for much of its second term, especially in March 1987 when Andreas Papandreou successfully handled a crisis in the Aegean with Turkey. By late 1988 however, both the government's popularity and Papandreou's health had declined. The former, because of press reports of financial and corruption scandals that surfaced, implicating Ministers and, allegedly, Andreas Papandreou himself as well as because of fiscal austerity measures imposed after the Keynesian policies of the first term. PASOK lost the June 1989 elections with 40% of the vote while the opposing New Democracy received 44.3%. PASOK had changed the electoral law before the elections, making it harder for the leading party to form a majority government, so the legislature was deadlocked.

Another election in November produced a very similar result. After a brief period of a grand coalition government, in which PASOK participated, a third election in April 1990 brought New Democracy back to power. Despite a 7% lead in popular vote over PASOK, New Democracy could only secure a marginal majority in the Hellenic Parliament, electing 152 MPs out of a total of 300; PASOK had secured a larger number of representatives on a lower percentage of votes, as well as a small overall lead, in the elections of 1985, under the previous electoral system. Its representation in the Parliament shrunk to 121 MPs in 1990.

In opposition, PASOK underwent a leadership crisis when Andreas Papandreou was prosecuted over his supposed involvement in the Bank of Crete scandal. He was eventually acquitted and, in a dramatic reversal of fortunes, at the October 1993 elections he led the party to another landslide victory. Papandreou returned to office with 47% of the vote and his re-election was considered by many a vote of confidence of the public against his prosecution. In November 1995, however, Papandreou's health began to deteriorate and the Party was racked with leadership conflicts.

Modernization period 

In January 1996 Andreas Papandreou retired after a protracted three-month-long hospitalization, during which he retained the role of Prime Minister; he died six months later. He was succeeded by Costas Simitis, the candidate of the modernising, pro-European wing of PASOK (the so-called "modernizers", εκσυγχρονιστές eksynchronistes), who won an internal vote against Akis Tsochatzopoulos, a Papandreou confidant. In the first days following his election, Costas Simitis faced the biggest crisis in Greek politics for over 20 years, with the Imia crisis. He was criticized for his soft stance against Turkey and especially for praising in public the American intervention on the issue.

In a PASOK conference held in the summer of 1996, following Andreas Papandreou's death, Costas Simitis was elected leader of the party and called early elections seeking a renewed public vote of confidence. Although the Imia crisis had somewhat tarnished his image, the country's economic prosperity and his matter-of-fact administration won him the September 1996 general election with a 41.5% of the vote. Under Costas Simitis' leadership, PASOK had two major successes: In September 1997 Greece won the right to stage the 2004 Summer Olympic Games and in 2001 it was confirmed that the country would be included in the Eurozone, for which it had failed to meet the convergence criteria in 1998. Costas Simitis won another term in April 2000, narrowly winning with 43.8% of the vote and 158 seats: a substantial achievement for a Party which had been in power almost continuously for nearly 20 years.

In 2000, after the assassination of Brigadier Saunders by the terrorist group 17 November (17N), and especially with the forthcoming Athens Olympics being a major terrorist target, a significant international pressure was exerted on PASOK to recognise that Greece had a terrorist problem and do everything possible to bring the terrorist group to justice. Some  amongst the western media had even falsely accusing the party of colluding with the terrorists, due to the fact that the authorities were unable to arrest the terrorists. Under the guidance of British and U.S. experts, the government intensified its efforts and finally, with a string of events starting at 29 June 2002, the 17N members were captured and put to trial.

George Papandreou leadership 
Nevertheless, the party was losing its traditional appeal to the Greek lower and middle classes. In order to revitalize the party's chances for the next elections, Costas Simitis announced his resignation as the leader of the party on 7 January 2004. He was succeeded by George Papandreou, son of Andreas Papandreou. The party members were expecting that Papandreou could reverse the slide in the opinion polls which saw the opposition New Democracy (ND), under Kostas Karamanlis, 7% ahead at the start of the year.

Although Papandreou reduced ND's lead in the polls to 3%, he was unable to reverse the view of the majority of Greek voters that PASOK had been in power too long and had grown lazy, corrupt and had abandoned the inclusive and progressive principles of economic parity on which it was founded. ND had a comfortable win at the 2004 legislative elections held on 7 March 2004, placing the party in opposition after eleven years in office with 40.55% share of the vote and 117 seats.

On 16 September 2007, New Democracy headed by Costas Karamanlis won re-election with a marginal majority of 152 seats in the Parliament. Despite ND's falling performance in the 2007 legislative election, PASOK suffered a crushing defeat, registering 38.1% of the vote, its lowest percentage in almost 30 years, and 102 seats in the Hellenic Parliament.

The dismal result led to activation of the procedure to select new leadership, or to reaffirm the previous one. The main competitors for the leadership were the incumbent George Papandreou and the Party's informal second in command, Professor Evangelos Venizelos. M.P. for A' Thessaloniki. M.P. Kostas Skandalidis also announced his candidacy in September. According to Party regulation, leaders are elected in a voting process open to all members. During the leadership election of 11 November 2007 George Papandreou was re-elected by the friends and members of the party as its leader.

In June 2009, the PASOK won the 2009 European Parliament election in Greece. Four months later, the Party enjoyed a resounding victory in the October 2009 general elections with 43.92% of the popular vote to ND's 33.48%, and 160 parliament seats to 91. Due to a number of defections and expulsions after 2009, by November 2011 PASOK held a slim majority of 152 of the parliament's 300 seats.

Decline 

A poll in October 2011 on behalf of the Greek TV channel Skai TV and the newspaper Kathimerini (after the austerity measures that were taken to tackle the financial crisis) revealed that of the people asked, 92% felt disappointed by the government while only 5% believed that a PASOK government would be best for the nation in the next elections. In the same survey, when asked about whether people have a positive or negative opinion of the various political parties in Greece, PASOK scored as the lowest, with 76% answering "negative".

Because of the financial crisis and the measures that were taken by the party from 2009 to 2012, PASOK, having been the largest party in the outgoing coalition government, achieved only third place with a mere 13.18%, retaining just 41 seats.

After the elections of 6 May 2012, the President of Greece, Karolos Papoulias, mandated New Democracy leader Antonis Samaras to form a coalition government. On 7 May 2012, Samaras gave up the attempt and on the following day, President Papoulias mandated Alexis Tsipras, president of the Synaspismos political party and head of the Coalition of the Radical Left (SYRIZA) parliamentary group. After Tsipras was also unable to form a government, Evangelos Venizelos was mandated, but he too had no success. The legislative elections of June 2012 resulted in a further reduction in PASOK's popular support, probably as a result of the unpopular memorandum signed by former Prime Minister George Papandreou with the IMF, European Commission and European Central Bank. PASOK's share of the overall vote was its worst ever showing since the party was formed (12.28%). However PASOK decided to help the formation of a government by joining with New Democracy (ND) as well as the Democratic Left (DIMAR) of Fotis Kouvelis in a coalition under Prime Minister Samaras.

To contest the 2014 European election, PASOK founded the Olive Tree electoral alliance on 7 March 2014. In the May 2014 European elections, the Olive Tree list came in fourth place nationally, receiving 8.02% of the vote, electing 2 MEPs.

On 29 December 2014, following the failure of the government to elect a presidential candidate, a snap January 2015 legislative election was called by Prime Minister Samaras, scheduled for 25 January 2015.

2015 legislative elections 
On 2 January 2015, in the run-up to the legislative election, former Prime Minister and PASOK leader George Papandreou announced the formation of a breakaway party called Movement of Democratic Socialists (KIDISO), a move immediately condemned by PASOK officials. Five PASOK members of the Hellenic Parliament were expected to join the new party, including the former ministers Philippos Sachinidis and Dimitris Reppas.

In the 25 January 2015 legislative election, PASOK received 4.7% of the vote, with mandate for 13 seats in the Hellenic Parliament.

On 30 August 2015, ahead of the upcoming September snap election, PASOK announced an electoral alliance with DIMAR, dubbed the Democratic Coalition.

In the September 2015 legislative election on 20 September 2015, the PASOK–DIMAR list received 6.3% of the vote, and 17 seats.

KINAL for 5 years before the return of PASOK

On 12 November 2017, an open primary was used as the first round of elections to select the leader of a new, as yet unfounded centre-left party in which PASOK would be folded. Nine initial leadership candidates include PASOK leader Fofi Gennimata, The River leader Stavros Theodorakis and incumbent Athens mayor Giorgos Kaminis. Reaching the second-round election were Gennimata, with 44.5% of the vote, and PASOK MEP Nikos Androulakis with 25.4%. The run-off election on 19 November was won by Gennimata with 56% of the vote. On 28 November 2017, the preliminary name of the new party was announced as "Movement for Change" (Kinima Allagis or KINAL).

On 2 July 2018, The River left KINAL. On 20 January 2019, DIMAR also left KINAL due to its position of supporting the Prespa agreement. On 1 June 2019 former PASOK leader Evangelos Venizelos left KINAL, accusing Gennimata of turning the Movement into "SYRIZA's tail".

KINAL increased its obtained seats in the 2019 Greek legislative election compared to Democratic Alignment, becoming Greece's third-largest party or coalition and securing 22 seats in the Hellenic Parliament. Following the election, KINAL positioned itself into opposition to the new Mitsotakis Government.

Gennimata died on 25 October 2021 at the Evangelismos Hospital in Athens from cancer.

Elections for the new leader took place in December 2021, with the main candidates being Andreas Loverdos, Nikos Androulakis, and George Papandreou. Nikos Androulakis was elected to lead the KINAL and PASOK on 12 December 2021.

On 9 May 2022 the alliance was rebranded "PASOK – Movement for Change" (PASOK-KINAL) and became a political party and absorbed the original party incarnation. The old PASOK symbol (the green sun) was restored soon after that.

International and European links 
PASOK is a member of the Socialist International, the Progressive Alliance and the Party of European Socialists. PASOK MEPs sit with the Progressive Alliance of Socialists and Democrats (S&D) group in the European Parliament.

Pasokification refers to the decline and rightward political shift of centre-left parties across Europe.

Election results

Hellenic Parliament

European Parliament

Party leaders

See also 
 Terrorism in Greece
 PASOKification
 History of Greece
 List of political parties in Greece
 Socialism in Greece
 Politics of Greece
 Party of European Socialists
 Progressive Alliance of Socialists and Democrats
 Socialist International

Notes

References 

 Dimitris Michalopoulos, "PASOK and the Eastern Block", in Greece under Socialism, New Rochelle, New York: Orpheus Publishing Inc., 1988, pp. 339–337.

External links 

  

 
Political parties established in 1974
1974 establishments in Greece
Social democratic parties in Greece
Full member parties of the Socialist International
Progressive Alliance
Party of European Socialists member parties
Greek irredentism
1970s in Greek politics
1980s in Greek politics
1990s in Greek politics
2000s in Greek politics
2010s in Greek politics
Pro-European political parties in Greece